"Renaud chante Brassens" (released in March 1996) is an album by French singer Renaud featuring cover versions of the songs of Georges Brassens. The original songs date from between 1952 and 1961. Public reaction to Renaud's reprises was generally positive even from Brassens fans. It was to be the last Renaud album for some six years until his rehabilitation from a period of alcoholism and his massive renewed success with Manhattan-Kaboul.

The video for Je suis un voyou inserted a suitably dressed Renaud as a character into original black-and-white footage of Brassens singing the song.

In 1997 Renaud chante Brassens was re-sold along with live album Tournée D'Enfer and best-of CD The Meilleur Of Renaud as three album discount re-packaging offer

Track listing
Je suis un voyou
La marine
Le gorille
La chasse aux papillons
Comme hier
Les amoureux des bancs publics
Brave Margot
Hécatombe
La mauvaise herbe
Le mauvais sujet repenti
La légende de la nonne
Auprès de mon arbre
Gastibelza
Les croquants
Philistins
Le vieux Léon
Le Père Nöel et la petite fille
La femme d'Hector
Le bistrot
L'orage
Jeanne
La complainte des filles de joie
Les illusions perdues

References

Renaud albums
1996 albums
Virgin Records albums